The 2004 UEFA European Under-21 Championship was the 14th staging of UEFA's European Under-21 Championship. The final tournament was hosted by Germany between 27 May and 8 June 2004.

Italy U-21s won the competition for the fifth time. Italy's Alberto Gilardino won the Golden Player award.

The top three teams in this competition qualified for Athens 2004 Olympics, along with hosts Greece U21s.

Qualification

The 48 national teams were divided into ten groups (two groups of four + eight groups of 5). The records of the ten group runners-up were then compared.  The top six joined the ten winners in a play-off for the eight finals spots.  One of the eight qualifiers was then chosen to host the remaining fixtures.

Squads

Matches

Group stage

Group A

Group B

Knockout stage

Semi-finals

Olympic play-off

Final

Goalscorers

4 goals
 Alberto Gilardino
 Johan Elmander
3 goals
 Hugo Almeida
 Markus Rosenberg
2 goals
 Benjamin Auer
 Daniele De Rossi
 Giuseppe Sculli
 Danko Lazović
1 goal
 Alexander Hleb
 Raman Kirenkin
 Pavel Kirylchyk
 Aleh Shkabara
 Niko Kranjčar
 Mario Lučić
 Eduardo da Silva
 Thomas Hitzlsperger
 Bastian Schweinsteiger
 Cesare Bovo
 Giampiero Pinzi

1 goal, cont.
 Carlitos
 Luis Lourenço
 Carlos Martins
 Pedro Oliveira
 Jorge Ribeiro
 Hugo Viana
 Branislav Ivanović
 Goran Lovre
 Miloš Marić
 Dejan Milovanović
 Simon Vukčević
 Stefan Ishizaki
 Jon Jönsson
 Babis Stefanidis
 Tranquillo Barnetta
 David Degen
 Baykal Kulaksızoğlu
 Johan Vonlanthen

Own goals
 Kim Jaggy (for Sweden)

Medal table and Olympic qualifiers 
 Greece (as hosts), Italy, Serbia & Montenegro and Portugal qualify for the Olympic games finals.
See Football at the 2004 Summer Olympics

External links 
 Results Archive at UEFA.com
 RSSSF Results Archive at rsssf.com

 
Under-21 Championship
UEFA European Under-21 Championship
International association football competitions hosted by Germany
UEFA
Football qualification for the 2004 Summer Olympics
UEFA European Under-21 Championship 
UEFA European Under-21 Championship 
UEFA European Under-21 Championship